Alfred John Thomas Slater Bailey (born 3 March 1932) is an Australian cricketer. He played three first-class matches for South Australia between 1953 and 1956.

See also
 List of South Australian representative cricketers

References

External links
 

1932 births
Living people
Australian cricketers
South Australia cricketers
Cricketers from Adelaide